Chemaxon is a cheminformatics and bioinformatics software development company, headquartered in Budapest with 250 employees. The company also has offices in Cambridge, San Diego, Basel and in Prague. and it has distributors in China, India, Japan, South Korea, Singapore, and Australia.

History

Chemaxon was founded in 1998 by two brothers, Ferenc and Péter Csizmadia. The company name was created by combining the words chem, indicating chemistry, and axon referring to a vast network of connections between the scientific and informatic domains. Initially, Chemaxon offered consultancy services and later moved into product development. As a startup company Chemaxon had strong ties with local universities engaged in software development projects with PhD students. Emerging technologies and software languages were studied, and as a result a platform independent, back end product line reliant on Java started to come together. The first Chemaxon software product was Marvin, a chemical editor. Its first version was released in January 1999. Marvin was followed by the development of the JChem technology, adding chemical intelligence to common database management systems with the first release in early 2000; also providing the first company sale that same year.

Chemaxon's first software developments were presented in scientific articles and posters presented in cheminformatics journals and conferences. The company revenue and user number increased rapidly in the early 2000s which resulted in the first user meeting in 2005. In 2004 Chemaxon began to a free software license package. Chemaxon also established representatives in the US from 2000, and in Japan via an official distributor company in 2005.

Growing user requests led to the development and the release of more software products. The company's product portfolio expanded with physical and chemical calculations and predictions, desktop based chemical database management applications and chemical naming intelligence. The growing trend affected employee numbers and required a larger head office space. The first official office headquarters opened in 2003 in the Máramaros köz, Budapest, Hungary. A software development office opened in Prague, Czech Republic, in 2006.

Chemaxon's desktop-based, cheminformatics product portfolio maturated in late 2000s. GlaxoSmithKline contracted with them in late 2009. The company started to experiment with agile software development approach in 2010, eventually adopting scrum methodology in the following year. Chemaxon encourages an agile office environment with cross-functional teams. This philosophy is supported by a publicly available online company culture guide. With the wave of change came new product development directions that mimicked the trends in the industry towards the end of the 2000s. The demand for online services emerged in research to allow lab colleagues to access chemical applications from all devices, enabling contract research organizations and other suppliers to collaborate with chemical data, and cut IT costs at the same time. Chemaxon started to build its cloud-based software systems in 2008  the first one being Chemicalize  and continuously expanded in this area. On the other hand, the rise of the biologics within newly developed pharmaceutical drugs influenced Chemaxon to start developing its biopolymer informatics portfolio in 2015. In 2011, Chemaxon moved its office headquarters to Graphisoft Park, one of Budapest's tech hubs, where the company is currently located. More offices were established: in 2014 a US East Coast headquarters opened in Cambridge, Massachusetts, followed by an office opening in San Diego in 2018.

Software
Chemaxon Products include tools for visualization and drawing of molecules, chemical database searching and management, and for drug discovery. Products are licensed free of charge for academic use.

Chemaxon’s desktop applications include Marvin which is free chemistry software for drawing and visualizing chemical structures, and Instant JChem, a desktop application for end user scientists; JChem for Excel which integrates the structure handling capabilities of JChem and Marvin within a Microsoft Excel environment.

The software can be used to predict pKa values and logP values.

The company developed Markush structure storage and search capabilities (without enumeration), with Markush structures from Thomson Reuters Derwent World Patents Index (DWPISM) database.

Pearson Education uses Chemaxon's JChem, MarvinSketch, and MarvinView as the chemistry tools in many of Pearson MasteringChemistry courses.

Methods

Molecule characterization data in the form of a simplified molecular-input line-entry system (SMILES) string can be uploaded into the Marvin software.

See also

Computational chemistry
Chemical database
Drug design
QSAR
Data mining
Molecule editor

References

External links
 Chemaxon's official homepage
 Marvin and Calculator Plugin online implementation Free structure drawing/image generation and structure based predictions; pKa, logP, logD, name<>structure, polar surface area (PSA), H-bond acceptor/donor, conformer, topology analysis, etc.

Cheminformatics
Drug discovery
Bioinformatics
Life sciences
Software companies of Hungary
Privately held companies of Hungary